I'm Still Swinging is an album by jazz trumpeter Joe Newman's Octet recorded in 1955 for the RCA Victor label. The album features cover art by Andy Warhol.

Reception

Allmusic awarded the album 3 stars.

Track listing
 "Top Hat, White Tie and Tails" (Irving Berlin) - 2:41
 "You Can Depend on Me" (Charles Carpenter, Louis Dunlap, Earl Hines) - 3:33
 "We'll Be Together Again" (Carl Fischer, Frankie Laine) - 3:38
 "It's Bad for Me" (Cole Porter) - 3:19
 "Exactly Like You" (Jimmy McHugh, Dorothy Fields) - 3:15 	
 "Shameful Roger" (Manny Albam) - 2:46
 "The Daughter of Miss Thing" (Ernie Wilkins) - 2:35
 "Sometimes I'm Happy" (Vincent Youmans, Irving Caesar) - 3:04 	
 "Sweethearts on Parade" (Carmen Lombardo, Charles Newman) - 2:41 
 "Slats" (Joe Newman, Wilkins) - 3:51 	
 "Lament for a Lost Love" (Duke Ellington, Barney Bigard, Irving Mills) - 3:11 	
 "Perfidia" (Alberto Domínguez, Milton Leeds) - 2:50 
Recorded at Webster Hall in New York City on October 3 (tracks 1, 2, 6 & 8-12) and October 4 (tracks 3-5 & 7), 1955

Personnel 
Joe Newman- trumpet
Urbie Green - trombone
Gene Quill - alto saxophone
Al Cohn - tenor saxophone
Dick Katz - piano
Freddie Green - guitar
Eddie Jones - bass
Shadow Wilson - drums

References 

1956 albums
RCA Records albums
Joe Newman (trumpeter) albums
Albums with cover art by Andy Warhol